The Slovenia national men's volleyball team represents Slovenia in international volleyball competitions and friendly matches, and is governed by the Volleyball Federation of Slovenia. Slovenia was the runner-up of the European Volleyball Championship three times, in 2015, 2019 and 2021. As of September 2022, Slovenia is ranked 9th in the FIVB World Rankings.

History
The Slovenian national team played its first official match on 24 April 1992, under the leadership of Viktor Krevsel. They make their first appearance at the European Volleyball Championship in 2001, where they finished in 12th place.

In March 2015, Andrea Giani was announced as new head coach of the Slovenian national team. In October 2015, Slovenia won its first medal at the 2015 European Volleyball Championships after losing in the final against France (3–0). Tine Urnaut won one of the individual player awards for the best outside spiker.

In January 2017, Giani resigned as coach, and in March 2017, Slobodan Kovač took over the team. In May 2017, Slovenia qualified for the 2018 edition of the FIVB Volleyball Men's World Championship, their first ever World Championship appearance.

In January 2019, the Volleyball Federation of Slovenia and Kovač both agreed to part ways and terminate the contract. He was replaced by Alberto Giuliani. In 2019, Slovenia hosted the 2019 edition of the FIVB Volleyball Men's Challenger Cup at home in Ljubljana. The team reached the final, where they defeated Cuba 3–0 and earned the right to participate in the 2020 Nations League, replacing Portugal; however, the competition was cancelled due to the COVID-19 pandemic, and Slovenia qualified for the 2021 edition instead. At their Nations League debut in Rimini, Italy, the team reached the final round as the only challenger team, where they lost 3–0 both to Poland and France in the semifinals and in the third place match, respectively.

At the 2019 European Championship, Slovenia was one of the four co-hosts of the tournament. The team reached the final again, where they lost 3–1 to Serbia, clinching their second silver medal in four years. Two years later, at the 2021 European Championship, Slovenia once again reached the final. After defeating hosts Poland in the semifinals, they lost the final 3–2 to Italy to claim their third silver medal. Gregor Ropret was selected in the All Star Team as the best setter through fan votes. Giuliani decided to step down as Slovenia head coach in September 2021, and was replaced by Mark Lebedew from February 2022. After failing to reach the top 8 in the 2022 Nations League, he was sacked and replaced by Gheorghe Crețu in August 2022, just two weeks before the start of the 2022 FIVB Volleyball Men's World Championship, hosted by Slovenia and Poland.

Team

Current squad
The following is the Slovenian roster for the 2022 World Championship.

Head coach: Gheorghe Crețu
Assistant coaches: Zoran Kedačič, Matteo De Cecco

Competition records
Key
 Champions   Runners-up   Third place   Fourth place   As host

World Championship

European Championship

World League

Nations League

Challenger Cup

European League

Head coaches

References

External links
Official website 
FIVB profile

National sports teams of Slovenia
Volleyball in Slovenia
National men's volleyball teams
Men's sport in Slovenia